Biljana Šljivić-Šimšić (20 January 1933 – 4 October 2019) was a professor emeritus at the University of Illinois and an author of several scholastic books, including a Serbian-English dictionary.

Early life and education
Biljana Šljivić was born in 1933 in Belgrade, Serbia, Kingdom of Yugoslavia. She obtained a degree from the University of Belgrade. In 1962, she moved from Yugoslavia to the United States, and went on to earn a master's degree and a Ph.D. from Harvard University (1966).

Career 
In 1967 Šljivić-Šimšić was appointed assistant professor at the University of Pennsylvania. She was also a research associate to Morton Benson at the University of Pennsylvania, and she is credited as a collaborator in the 1971 edition of the Serbocroatian-English dictionary that was first published in 1971 with the most recent edition dated 2017. Šljivić arrived at the University of Illinois at Chicago in 1973, and spent the rest of her career there. First an associate professor, then a full professor, she was also the head of the Department of Slavic and Baltic Languages ​​and Literature. She was named emeritus in 2009. In addition to the dictionary, Šljivić-Šimšić is known for textbooks used for learning the Serbian language.

She was one of the founders of the North American Society for Serbian Studies, its first secretary treasurer (1978-1983) and its president (1984-1986).

Selected publications

Honors 
In 2021 there was a monograph published to honor her work.

References

External links
, February 11, 2021

1933 births
2019 deaths
University of Belgrade alumni
Harvard University alumni
University of Illinois faculty
Linguists of Serbo-Croatian
Women linguists
Slavists